West Hampstead is a ward in the London Borough of Camden, in the United Kingdom. The ward was established for the May 2002 election. The population of this ward was 12,060 at the 2011 Census. In 2018, the ward had an electorate of 8,322. The Boundary Commission projects the electorate to rise to 8,926 by 2025.

The ward underwent minor boundary changes for the 2022 election.

Election results

References

Wards of the London Borough of Camden
2002 establishments in England